Katznelson is a surname may refer to:

 Berl Katznelson, a Labor Zionism philosopher
 Avraham Katznelson (Avraham Nissan), Zionist political figure, a signatory of the Israeli declaration of independence.
 Yitzhak Katznelson, an Israeli mathematician
 Shulamit Katznelson, Israeli educator and ulpan founder
 Shmuel Tamir (born Katznelson), a member of the Israeli Knesset, son of Bat-Sheva Katznelson
 Ira Katznelson, an American political scientist and historian
 Zachary Philip Katznelson, British lawyer

For a related spelling, Katzenelson:

 Itzhak Katzenelson, Jewish teacher, poet, and dramatist

Another spelling, Katsnelson, is used, although it is not as common as the other two.

 Mikhail Katsnelson, Russian-Dutch physicist

Other variants:

 
 
 

It might be noted that Katzenelson and Katzenellenbogen are not the same lineage. Katzenelsons are regarded as Cohanim (descendants of the priesthood through male lineage, part of the tribe of Levi). For example, the designation "HaCohen" (the cohen) is engraved into the tombstone of Berl Katzenelson.  The illustrious family Katzenellenbogen are regarded as Yisraelim (descendants of tribes other than Levi). In as much as the designations Cohen, Levi and Yisrael follow paternal lineage, it is unlikely that well known families that have different designations would share a paternal line.

References

Surnames
Jewish surnames
Yiddish-language surnames